Thorkildsen may refer to:

Andreas Thorkildsen (born 1982), Norwegian javelin thrower, born in Kristiansand
Anton Thorkildsen Omholt (1861–1925), the Norwegian Minister of Finance 1913-1920
Frederik Thorkildsen Wexschall (1798–1845), Danish classic composer and violinist
Inga Marte Thorkildsen (born 1976), Norwegian politician for the Socialist Left Party
Theis Jacob Thorkildsen Lundegaard or Teis Lundegaard (1774–1856), Norwegian farmer and politician

See also
Thorkelson
Thorkildsen-Mather Borax Company
Thorkild
Torkelsen
Torkildsen
Therkildsen

Norwegian-language surnames